Angelo Patri (November 26, 1876 – September 13, 1965) was an Italian-American author and educator.

His real surname was Petraglia, and he was born in Piaggine (Salerno province) of south-western Italy. Patri came to the United States when he was five. He gained a B.A. at the College of the City of New York in 1897, and an M.A. at Columbia University in 1904. A schoolteacher in New York from 1898 to 1908, he may have been the first Italian-born American to become a school principal in the United States. In attempting to engage the student with tasks that went beyond book learning, he was influenced by the writings of John Dewey. From 1908 to 1913 he was principal of Public School No. 4, and in 1913 he became principal of Public School 45, Bronx, New York. He wrote a syndicated column, "Our Children", on child psychology, for newspapers and magazines.  He died in Danbury, Connecticut, on September 13, 1965.

The Angelo Patri Middle School, MS 391 in the Bronx is named in his honor.

Works
Books for parents and teachers:
A School Master of the Great City, 1917
The School That Everybody Wants, 1922
Child Training, 1922
 "Talks to Mothers", 1923 (Presented with the compliments of 'The Thomas Dalby Company' Watertown. Mass.)
School and Home, 1925
Problem of Childhood, 1926
What Have You Got to Give?, 1926
The Questioning Child, 1928
Your Children In Wartime, 1943
 How to help your child grow up (Chicago: Rand McNally, 1948)

Books for children:
White Patch, 1911
Pinocchio in Africa, 1911 (tr.)
Spirit of America, 1924
Pinocchio in America, 1928
The Adventures of Pinocchio, 1937 (tr.)

References

External links
 
 

1876 births
1965 deaths
American school principals
Italian educators
American educators
Italian emigrants to the United States